Whitfield is a hamlet and former parish in Derbyshire, England. It is located a half mile (1km) south of Glossop Town Hall, south of Glossop Brook between Bray Clough and Hurst Brook.  The name Whitfield in Anglo-Saxon times meant 'bright or white pasture or field'; up to the latter part of the 18th century the hamlet was devoted mostly to agriculture with an area of 2,608 statute acres. Whitfield was one of the original townships in the ancient Parish of Glossop, and the manor, the area rose in altitude from approximately 490 to 985 feet (45 to 91.5 m) above mean sea level. The urban area currently covers about a half mile (1km), built across a hillside and is situated in the upper part is part of the Peak District National Park. The highest point is Mill Hill at 1,785 feet (544 m) on the Pennine Way, 2 miles from Whitfield. 

The Manor of Whitfield was conveyed in 1330 to John Foljambe. Though held with the manor of Glossop, the land in Whitfield was mostly not part of the Norfolk estate unlike most of the manor of Glossop. When it was enclosed by act of parliament in 1810 it was recorded as being . Included in Whitfield are the villages of Charlestown and Littlemoor.
 
The Turnlee Paper factory was in Littlemoor. St James, Littlemoor, was consecrated in 1845 and is built in the Early English style, with tower and  spire. There is a Methodist Chapel at Whitfield; the Wesleyan Reformers and Independent Calvinists had chapels at Littlemoor.

When Glossop expanded, and the Howardtown Mills constructed, Whitfield was subsumed into the new town. Power looms were introduced into these mills in 1825. In 1835 Whitfield church was extended to take the increased congregation, and a Church of England Primary school was built in 1848; an infant school was added by Anne Kershaw Wood in 1913.

See also
Listed buildings in Whitfield, Derbyshire

References

Towns and villages of the Peak District
Hamlets in Derbyshire
Glossop